Events from the year 1719 in Canada.

Incumbents
French Monarch: Louis XV
British and Irish Monarch: George I

Governors
Governor General of New France: Philippe de Rigaud Vaudreuil
Colonial Governor of Louisiana: Jean-Baptiste Le Moyne de Bienville
Governor of Nova Scotia: John Doucett
Governor of Placentia: Samuel Gledhill

Events
 Construction of Fortress Louisbourg by the French begins on Ile Royale (Cape Breton Island).

Births

Deaths

References 

 
Canada
19